Alexandre Delettre (born 25 October 1997) is a French professional racing cyclist, who currently rides for UCI WorldTeam .

In his first race as a full professional, Delettre made the breakaway on stage 1 of the 2021 Étoile de Bessèges and took the lead in the mountains classification, which he managed to hold on to for the rest of the race.

Major results 
2015
 1st Stage 3 Ain'Ternational-Rhône Alpes-Valromey Tour
2019
 4th Polynormande
2021
 1st  Mountains classification Étoile de Bessèges
 6th Polynormande
 8th Classic Loire Atlantique

References

External links 
 

1997 births
Living people
French male cyclists
Sportspeople from Val-d'Oise
People from Gonesse
Cyclists from Île-de-France